NGC 5910 is an elliptical galaxy located about 540 million light-years away in the constellation Serpens. It was discovered by astronomer William Hershel on April 13, 1785. NGC 5910 is also a strong radio source with a conspicuous nuclear jet.

Physical characteristics
NGC 5910 appears to have a double nucleus, with a faint nuclear dust lane also being observed.  

A pair of asymmetries in the isotopotal profile of NGC 5910 with one of them being brighter than the other, weaker asymmetry suggests a past merger and collision of one or more galaxies.

Group membership
NGC 5910 is the brightest and dominant member of a compact group of galaxies known as Hickson Compact Group 74. The other members are 2MASX J15193179+2053005, PGC 54692, PGC 54694, and MCG+04-36-036. The other galaxies appear to be embedded within a common envelope that belongs to NGC 5910.

NGC 5910 appears to lie near the Hercules Superclusters.

See also
List of NGC objects (5001–6000)
NGC 6166

External links

References

5910
054689
Serpens (constellation)
Astronomical objects discovered in 1785
Elliptical galaxies
Radio galaxies
Hickson 74